Roger Pielke may refer to:

 Roger A. Pielke (born 1946), American meteorologist
 Roger A. Pielke, Jr. (born 1968), American political scientist